Margarita Arellanes Cervantes is a Mexican politician born in Monterrey affiliated with the National Action Party.

In 2012 she won the Monterrey municipal elections and became the first female municipal president of Monterrey.

Arellanes was elected to a three-year term but in December 2014 left office to seek her party nomination as the PAN candidate for the 2015 Gubernatorial election. Arellanes began the internal race as the favorite candidate but after losing support from different party leader she was defeated by candidate Felipe de Jesús Cantú Rodríguez. In March 2015 she took office again to finish her term as Mayor of Monterrey.

References

Living people
Women mayors of places in Mexico
Municipal presidents of Monterrey
Year of birth missing (living people)
21st-century Mexican politicians
21st-century Mexican women politicians
Autonomous University of Nuevo León alumni